Park Hae-Mi (born January 28, 1964) is a South Korean actress. She is best known as a musical theatre actress, starring in stage productions of Mamma Mia!, 42nd Street, and Really Really Like You. Park rose to mainstream popularity with her roles in the television drama Dear Heaven and the sitcom High Kick!.

Filmography

Television series

Films

Web series

Variety shows

Ambassadorship 
 Public Relations Ambassador of the Seoul Social Welfare Council (2021)

Theater

Awards and nominations

References

External links
Park Hae-mi at Cyworld

1963 births
Living people
South Korean musical theatre actresses
South Korean television actresses
South Korean film actresses
Ewha Womans University alumni